Martina Lopez (born 1962) is an American photographer known for her digital media works combining landscapes and 19th-century portraiture. She is currently a professor at the University of Notre Dame in Notre Dame, Indiana, although she is originally from Seattle, Washington.

Early life and education 
Raised in a white middle-class neighborhood in Seattle, with seven other siblings of second generation Mexican descent, Lopez found inspiration in her personal life for her works. As a photography student at the University of Washington in 1986, she dabbled in digital images. While still in school, her father died and Lopez turned to old photo albums to reminisce, when she did this the photos awoke a curiosity and she became inspired to rewrite the narratives differently than what the photographs presented.

Lopez has a Bachelor's degree from University of Washington in Seattle, and a Master's degree in 1990 from the School of the Art Institute of Chicago. She is currently a professor of Photography in the Art History department at the University of Notre Dame.

Collections 
Lopez's work has been held at The Crossroads Gallery for Contemporary Art, in which curator David Travis writes an extensive description of her work in relation to the collection.

Other museums holding her work include the Seoul Museum of Art, the Philadelphia Museum of Art, the Smithsonian American Art Museum and the Art Institute of Chicago.

Honors and awards 
Awarded National Endowment for the Arts Visual Arts Photography Fellowship.

Publications 
 Aperture Magazine, Portfolios 1: Computer Photomontage (1994)
 Naomi Rosenblum's A World History of Photography
 The Digital Eye by Silvia Wolf
 100 Ideas That Changed Photography by Mary Warner Marien
 Digital Photography: Truth, Meaning, Aesthetics by Steven Skopik

Bibliography 
 Sylvia Wolf,(1995). Memory/Reference: The Digital Photography of Martina Lopez, The Art Institute of Chicago
 Aperture (1994) Vol.136, Martina Lopez, 
 Newsweek (1994), Barbara Kantrowitz, Vol.124, An Evolving Technoculture,

References

External links 
 http://www.martinalopezphoto.com

Living people
University of Notre Dame faculty
University of Washington alumni
American graphic designers
Artists from Seattle
School of the Art Institute of Chicago alumni
21st-century American women artists
1952 births
American women academics